Roberto Bautista Agut was the defending champion, but lost in the second round to Nikoloz Basilashvili.

Roger Federer won his 8th Dubai title, and 100th ATP singles title overall, defeating Stefanos Tsitsipas, 6–4, 6–4, in the final. Federer became the second male tennis player in history after Jimmy Connors in 1983 to win 100 ATP singles titles. 

Following his run to the final, Tsitsipas entered the top 10 in the ATP rankings for the first time in his career, becoming the first Greek player to achieve this feat.

Seeds

Draw

Finals

Top half

Bottom half

Qualifying

Seeds

Qualifiers

Lucky losers

Qualifying draw

First qualifier

Second qualifier

Third qualifier

Fourth qualifier

References

External links
 Main draw
 Qualifying draw

Mens Singles